I Hart Food is an American food travelogue television series that aired on Food Network. It was presented by foodie and YouTube personality Hannah Hart, who also served as executive producer. The series featured Hart traveling to eateries in different cities and learning how to cook foods of different ethnic cuisines.

I Hart Food officially premiered on August 14, 2017 and concluded on September 18, 2017.

Episodes

Notes

References

External links
 
 

2010s American cooking television series
2017 American television series debuts
2017 American television series endings
English-language television shows
Food Network original programming
Food reality television series
Food travelogue television series